"My Destiny" is a song recorded by American singer and songwriter Lionel Richie. It was released in 1992 as the second single from his first compilation album, Back to Front (1992), by Motown Records. It was written by Richie and produced by himself and Stewart Levine. The song achieved some success, and it even topped the Dutch  Single Top 100 and peaked at number two in the Dutch Top 40. It also appeared on Richie's best of albums Truly: The Love Songs and The Definitive Collection.

Critical reception
Bryan Buss from AllMusic described the song as "classic, smooth Richie". J.D. Considine noted its "low-key vocals and understated, fatback groove". Larry Flick from Billboard wrote, "Lively pop/R&B instrumentation, a la Simply Red, triggers his most relaxed and spirited vocal in years. Familiarity of chorus will assist in winning friends at urban, top 40, and AC levels. Far more satisfying than the previous "Do It To Me"." Fell and Rufer from the Gavin Report commented, "A love song with a brilliant beat, this fresh Richie track from his retrospective album, Back to Front, is sure to be a crowdpleaser."

Music video
In the accompanying music video for "My Destiny", directed by Mary Lambert, Richie sings in front of four dancing supermodels with his shirt unbuttoned.

Track listings

 7" single
 "My Destiny" (lite mix edit) – 3:50
 "Do It to Me" (rhythm method single edit) – 4:35

 12" maxi
 "My Destiny" (hiphouse #2 mix) – 5:55
 "Do It to Me" (rhythm method single edit) – 4:35
 "Do It to Me" (rhythm method extended mix) – 6:32
 "My Destiny" (lite mix edit) – 3:50

 CD maxi
 "My Destiny" (lite mix edit) – 3:49
 "Do It to Me" (rhythm method single edit) – 4:36
 "My Destiny" (hiphouse #2 mix) – 5:59
 "Do It to Me" (rhythm method extended mix) – 6:32

 Cassette
 "My Destiny" (lite mix edit)
 "Do It to Me" (rhythm method single edit)
 "My Destiny" (lite mix edit)
 "Do It to Me" (rhythm method single edit)

Charts

Weekly charts

Year-end charts

Certifications

References

1992 singles
Lionel Richie songs
Songs written by Lionel Richie
Motown singles
1992 songs
Funk songs
Dance-pop songs
New jack swing songs
Music videos directed by Mary Lambert